Earthology Records is the record label of Cloud Cult's Craig Minowa and Connie Minowa formed in 1997 on their organic farm  The label's buildings are powered by geothermal energy and were partially constructed with reclaimed wood and recycled plastic. It is also a non-profit label that only uses recycled materials for its CDs and donates all its profits to charity.

References

Further reading
 

American independent record labels
Independent record labels based in Minnesota